The Morane-Saulnier MS.129 and its derivatives in the MS.130 series were a family of military trainer aircraft produced in France in the 1920s. They were conventional, parasol-wing monoplanes with open cockpits in tandem and fixed tailskid undercarriage. The initial version, the MS.129, was produced in small numbers for the Romanian Air Force and civil users, but the major production version was the MS.130, which equipped the French Navy and a number of foreign air arms.

The second MS.130 prototype won the 1929 Coupe Michelin, flown by Michel Detroyat  with an average speed of 190 km/h (120 mph).

The MS.130 was further developed as the MS.230, and at least two MS.130s were later rebuilt to this new standard.

Variants

MS.129 initial production version with Hispano-Suiza 8Ab engine.
MS.130 major production version with Salmson 9AB engine; 146 built.
MS.131 MS.130 converted to use a  Lorraine 7Me engine (1 converted for US military attaché in Paris)
MS.132 version with Salmson 7Ac engine for French Navy ; 5 built.
MS.133 version with Gnome-Rhône 5Kc engine; 3 converted from MS.129, 1 converted from MS.130.
MS.134 conversion of MS.130 with Clerget 9B engine

The MS.135, MS.136, MS.137, MS.138, and MS.139 were of a different design derived from the MS.35, and not related to the MS.130.

Operators
  France
 Aéronavale (MS.130)
 Aéronautique Militaire (MS.130)
  Brazil (15 × MS.130)
 Brazilian Air Force
 Varig (MS.130)
  Belgium (2 × MS.130)
 China (MS.130)
 Guatemala (MS.130)
 
Portuguese Air Force (1 x MS.130, 4 x MS.133)
 Romania (MS.129)
 Turkey (MS.130)

Specifications (MS.130)

See also

Notes

References

Further reading

1920s French military trainer aircraft
MS.130
Single-engined tractor aircraft
Parasol-wing aircraft
Aircraft first flown in 1925